USS Tatnuck may refer to:

  a  laid down in 1918 and struck in 1946
  a  serving from 1944 to 1971

United States Navy ship names